The Spook's Battle, written by Joseph Delaney, is the fourth story in The Wardstone Chronicles series. It was released in America in March 2008, and is titled Attack of the Fiend, as the fourth book in the Spook's series.

Plot
Tom's mother has returned to her own land, Greece. In a special room in the family farmhouse, she has left behind three trunks only to be opened by her youngest son Tom. The Spook sends Tom and Alice to retrieve the trunks, but they arrive to find the farm ransacked, the trunks gone and Tom's brother Jack, his pregnant wife Ellie, and their young daughter Mary all missing, kidnapped and taken to Pendle, a witch controlled area.

While Alice goes ahead to Pendle to see if she can learn anything about the missing family, Tom leaves word for his next-oldest brother, James, then goes back to Chipenden where the Spook has just been visited by a Pendle priest, Father Stocks, who tells the Spook that the witches are allying to summon the Fiend (Devil) himself. Stocks is a fully trained spook and former apprentice of Gregory, although later joined the usually anti-spook church. He nevertheless is an ally of Tom.

After arriving in Pendle, Tom sees a young blonde girl named Mab, who tells him that Alice has been put under a spell of binding by the Mouldheel witch clan, and she needs his help. Mab leads Tom to a clearing where her two twin sisters, Beth and Jennet, before realizing they are all witches (Mab is a powerful young Mouldheel scryer). Tom escapes thanks to Alice's brand on his arm, which protects him from other witches, and follows the girls as they flee.

Tracking them to a small village, Tom rescues Alice from a cottage, noticing the seer Tibb, a small bald creature with sharp teeth and a hairy back and limbs, and all are watching Tom and Alice. Alice tells Tom that she is bound to the place by a spell cast by Mab; to be freed, Tom has to burn a lock of Alice's hair that Mab has taken. Alice tells Tom that his family is locked up in Malkin Tower, a nearly-impenetrable fortress.

Tom and Father Stocks go to the local magistrate, Roger Nowell, and are met by the housekeeper Mistress Wurmalde, whom Tom recognises as a witch. Tom swears out a complaint of kidnapping. Magistrate Nowell sets out for Malkin Tower with Tom and Father Stocks, taking along a constable and two bailiffs. When the witches won't admit them, the magistrate tells Tom and Father Stocks to go back to his house, where they will be his guests for the night while he rides to the nearest army garrison for help.

Father Stocks eats the food Mistress Wurmalde serves them, but Tom refuses it – and thus avoids being drugged into a stupor. During the night, Mistress Wurmalde leaves Read Hall in a carriage and later returns, hiding the seer Tibb beneath her voluminous skirts.  Mistress Wurmalde reveals herself to be an old enemy of Tom's mother from Greece, and tells him that his brother is being tortured by Grimalkin and it is his fault for continuing his mother's work against the Dark. She promises to release Tom's family if Tom gives her the key to his mother's trunks that he wears around his neck. She gives him one day to decide.

Back in his guest room, Tom hears Father Stocks begging for mercy but finds himself unable to rise from the bed to go help the priest, whose blood is being drunk by Tibb. Soon, Tibb arrives in Tom's room. Hanging from the ceiling over the bed, Tibb tells Tom that he sees his future: Tom will be alone, his master dead, and a girl will love him, betray him and finally die for him. He demands to know what is in the trunks, and Tom tells him the trunks contain the death of Tibb and the Pendle clans.

In the morning, Father Stocks is weak from loss of blood and near death. Tom climbs out a window and runs to Downham but finds the Spook gone; Alice tells him that Tom's brother James, having received the word Tom left that he was headed for Pendle, arrived during the night and he and the Spook set out together. They leave a note for the Spook, and together, Tom and Alice head back to Read Hall to save Father Stocks. On the way, Alice tells Tom that Mab Mouldheel has made an offer: if they help her get the trunks for herself, she will help them free Tom's family through a tunnel under the Tower.

When they get back to Read Hall, they find Father Stocks has been stabbed to death by Mistress Wurmalde and that she has told the returned Magistrate Nowell that the murderer is Tom, whom she caught trying to rob the house in the night. Tom is thrown in a cell, but Alice gets away. Wurmalde visits Tom in his cell and demands the trunk keys, but he refuses (the keys must be given willingly to work).

The constable places Tom in stocks and takes him to the Tower to meet up with the Magistrate and the army battalion he has brought. The battalion begin a siege of the Tower, firing cannonballs at the walls surrounding it throughout the day but not breaching it. That night, Tom (still in stocks and now hungry and dehydrated) makes a run for it, but sees witches led by Mab Mouldheel surrounding the sleeping soldiers and decides he can't leave them to die. The soldiers were drugged just like Father Stocks had been and won't wake. Tom tells Mab that he'll give her the trunks if she spares the soldiers lives, so she does and takes Tom with her to meet Alice, who is with her sisters.

Tom promises Mab the keys to all three trunks after she helps him rescue his family, and she agrees. She takes him and Alice through a mausoleum in an old graveyard and into a tunnel that enters the Tower. Tom and Alice rescue Mab from a wight (a dead sailor reanimated by dark magic) and Alice forces Mab to give her the lock of Alice's hair that Mab had been using to bind Alice, then burns it.

They reach the cell where Tom's family is being held. Jack's mind has fled, and Ellie tells Tom he has been that way since they left the farm. Tom thinks this may have been caused when the witches forced Jack to enter the protected room to get the trunks for them, as Mam had said that no one but Tom and Alice should ever enter that room. Their one candle goes out and unable to find their way back down through the tunnels, they decide to all go up into the Tower and try to make their escape once the cannons breach the walls. Tom and Alice carry Jack.

When they hear the drawbridge being opened, they go up and find the three trunks in front of it. The Malkin witches fled the Tower when the soldiers breached it, but now the soldiers are leaving – invaders have arrived from overseas to attack the country, and war is beginning. Mab had seen it coming through her scrying, and timed everything so that now her Mouldheel clan could arrive and take the trunks. Mab says her clan will not join with the Deanes and the Malkins to raise the Fiend, but will take over the Tower for themselves.

Tom refuses to give Mab the keys, but when Mab holds a knife to little Mary's throat, he gives in. Mab opens the first trunk and finds Mam's wedding gown, some vials of liquid, bags full of gold, books in Greek, and a letter to Tom, also in Greek. It says that only he can open the other two trunks, in moonlight, and that Mam's two sisters sleep inside them and will protect Tom with their own lives if necessary. Without telling Mab what is in the other two trunks, he agrees to open them that night if Alice and his family are set free, and Mab lets them go.

As the moon shines that night, Tom opens the two trunks. When the moon shines on the two winged, feral lamia witches inside, they spring to life. They sniff and recognise Tom as their kin, but chase Mab and her clan from the Tower (which Mab has already had masons repair). Before she leaves, Mab tells Tom that to take revenge upon him, the Mouldheels will now join with the other two clans after all and bring the Fiend into the world.
Tom now knows that his own mother is a lamia witch. He stays inside the Tower, and that night Alice returns with the Spook and Tom's brother James.

Alice tells Tom that she left his brother Jack with her aunt, Agnes Sowerbutts, who is tending to him. The Spook and James had been busy rousing the men of Downham and helping them to chase the Deane clan out of town. The next day, James goes back to Downham to rally the men to come to the Tower. The Spook stays behind to release the tormented spirits of all the people ever murdered in the Tower, while Tom and Alice go to Agnes Sowerbutts’ to get Jack, Ellie and Mary and bring them into the safety of the Tower.

Agnes uses a mirror to spy on Mab and sees her plotting with Mistress Wurmalde and Tibb. Jack is physically recovered but still confused and unable to speak. He, Ellie and Mary go with Tom and Alice back to the Tower.

The next day, Tom and the Spook set out to deal with Mistress Wurmalde and Tibb at Read Hall. They find Magistrate Nowell's body and see that Tibb killed him and drank his blood. But Tibb himself is dying, having been abandoned by Wurmalde; his life was only meant to last nine weeks, and is coming to an end. He tells Tom that Mam gave up her immortality and sentenced herself to serve a mortal man – Tom's father – as penance for her ill deeds as a lamia and that she fashioned Tom as her weapon against the Dark. The Spook kills Tibb.

Back at the Tower, Alice has used some of the potions in Mam's trunk to create a cure for Jack's mind, and he is sleeping under its effects. Alice, Tom and the Spook set out once again to Downham.

By night, James leads the village men to confront the gathered witches while Tom, Alice and the Spook try to capture the leader, Mistress Wurmalde. They almost fail, but the two lamia witches swoop down from the sky and scatter the witches, and one of them kills Wurmalde. Mab gets away, but not before telling Alice that the ritual to raise the Fiend has already been completed and they are too late.

The Spook tells Tom to get back to his family farm and lock himself in his mother's room that no evil can enter; the Fiend will be under the witches’ control for two days, and if Tom can survive that long, the Fiend will be free in the world and move on to other mischief.

On the way home, Tom is intercepted by Mab, who tells him she did it all because she loved him and he betrayed her. She also tells him that even if the Fiend doesn't get him, the Malkins have sent Grimalkin, the clan's ferocious witch assassin, after him.

Tom runs for hours and is almost home when Grimalkin catches up to him. He lets her think he is surrendering to death at her hands, then uses the blade of his staff to pin her to a tree after a feint. As he turns to run, Grimalkin hurls a blade at him. Unconsciously, Tom slows time and plucks the blade out of the air, then makes it into the house and the safety of the protected room. Although he hears the Fiend outside, it cannot enter the room, and Tom falls asleep, exhausted.

When he wakes, the ghost of Father Stocks appears to him and tells him it is in despair and cannot find hope. Tom helps the priest to focus on a good memory, and he is able to enter the light, his soul free. Daylight enters the room, and Tom knows that two days have passed and he can leave the room. It is his fourteenth birthday.

Some weeks later, Tom is back at Chipenden with the Spook and Alice. James has moved back to the family farm with Jack, Ellie and Mary and is helping to look after them while Jack continues his recovery. The Fiend is loose in the world, but not actively hunting Tom for now.

Characters

Thomas J. Ward (The main character and the Spook's Apprentice)
Alice Deane (A girl coming from a family of witches and Tom's best friend)
The Spook (Tom's master and a famous Spook)
Father Stocks (John Gregory's former apprentice)
Mab Mouldheel (A young witch who loves Tom but by the end of the book betrays him)
Grimalkin (A Witch assassin who is known for her scissors and the way she cuts people with them.)

External links
Random House Page
Full Length Commentary of Attack of the Fiend

2007 British novels
Children's fantasy novels
British children's novels
The Bodley Head books